K.A. Colorado (Kenneth Auther Colorado, born 5 April 1946), is an American-Canadian visual artist, painter, and sculptor best known for his representational work depicting climate change, deep cold, and the environment.  He was the Artist-in-Residence for the National Oceanic and Atmospheric Administration, and is the creator of the Ice Core Sculpture Series depicting Polar scientific studies, material, and DNA from around the world.   

K.A. Colorado co-founded the first International Snow and Ice Sculpture Competition and Winter Festival in Perm, Russia, which brought Western and Russian artists together and opened Perm, Russia to American artists and visitors for the first time

Artwork and Achievements

Permanent Collections

K.A. Colorado creates and performs artwork that depicts climate change, environment, and the Arctic and Antarctic regions. His sculptures and paintings have been acquired by artistic, scientific, and educational organizations internationally, and are in the permanent collections of the following institutions:  

 University of Portland (UP, Oregon) – Ice Core Series:  Paintings depicting ice cores on Arctic terrain.
 University of Northern British Columbia (UNBC, Canada) – A 60-Second Time-Lapse of the World massive paintings installation depicting vanishing icebergs, three masterpieces Iceberg Paintings, two Iceberg Sculptures, Confluence of Rivers steel pyramid, and On Thin Ice wall sculpture.  
 National Oceanic and Atmospheric Administration (NOAA, U.S.A.) – Ice Core Sculptures portraying ocean health and climate change, completed by the artist for permanent exhibition for the National Marine Sanctuaries
 National Oceanic and Atmospheric Administration, Seattle Campus – Masterpiece Iceberg Paintings
 National University of Tierra del Fuego (Universidad Nacional de Tierra del Fuego, UNTDF, South America) – Ice Core Sculptures and Frost-Byte Series  
 King George Secondary School (Vancouver School Board, British Columbia, Canada) – On Thin Ice wall sculpture reflecting the perceived beauty of ice and referencing its potential loss due to climate change.  
 Lewis and Clark College Law Library (Portland, Oregon) – Othello’s Gribskov’s Run, part of a series of paintings featuring dogs on icebergs.  
 Hallie Ford Museum of Art (Willamette University, Salem, Oregon) – Ice Core Painting
 Vancouver Maritime Museum (British Columbia, Canada) – On Thin Ice wall sculpture incorporating historical archival information about the Arctic and the Northwest Passage

International Snow Sculpture

K.A. Colorado is one of the two founders of the first International Snow and Ice Sculpture Competition and Winter Festival in Perm, Russia.  City leaders in the Perm Region of Russia credit K.A. Colorado with establishing, organizing, and launching this annual competition that opened the city and brought in international participants and visitors.  Colorado was the first American to establish, compete, and judge in a snow and ice sculpture competition in Perm, and the first to organize and invite participants from throughout the globe.  He co-founded the competition with Russian artist Yuri Lapshin, and formed the Russian Open Snow and Ice Sculpture Championship, which became a traditional and popular Perm festival.  First held in 1995, the International Festival "Snow, Ice, and Fire" is an exhibition of ice and snow sculptures performed by sculptors from around the world.  The annual festival has evolved throughout the years, with artists from many countries participating in works of sculpture, paintings, graphics, objects, and photographs, and remains a significant event for the city, initially made possible by Colorado.

Series, Exhibitions, and Installations

In 2003, K.A. Colorado began a major series of Iceberg Paintings that portrayed icebergs below and above the waterline, with light reflecting and refracting, that caught the attention of Dr. Jorge Rabassa, the noted geologist and glaciologist, who invited Colorado to the Arctic Scientific Research Library at CADIC-CONICET CADIC in Ushuaia, Argentina, Tierra del Fuego, to study icebergs and the changing conditions in the Antarctic.  

K.A. Colorado was the sole artist invited among noted climatologists and scientists to present at the International Conference on Hydrometeorological Security held in Moscow, Russia in September 2006.

In 2008, K.A. Colorado began his proprietary series of Ice Core Sculptures, a group of over 100 three-dimensional artworks portraying scientific ice cores such as those used by scientists to analyze historical environmental data and incorporating written script, DNA, or artifacts from scientists and Polar regions.  

K.A. Colorado was selected as Artist of the Year by LA Artcore Union Center in 2008, in recognition of his work focusing on climate change, and was given a special exhibition of his climate change art in 2009, entitled Polar Dialogue 2009, which featured sculptures and paintings.  The show included several of Colorado's signature Ice Core Sculpture Series which incorporate excerpts of written text from climate change scientist and professionals, embedded into sculptures that emulate ice core samplings.  

In 2010, K.A. Colorado was invited to speak at TEDx in Monterey, where he presented a talk entitled The Cow on the Iceberg about his experiences encountering wildlife and ice in Patagonia, and where he exhibited samples of his proprietary Ice Core Sculpture Series.  

That same year, the artist's exhibition Animals on Polar Ice was held at the West Vancouver Memorial Library in Canada, and featured Colorado's paintings of animals on icebergs – Polar bears, muskox, cows, and dogs – as well as his Ice Core Sculptures imbedded with animal DNA (The cow on the iceberg, North Shore Outlook, April 22, 2010).  The exhibition included a lecture by the artist.  

Earth Day 2010 was commemorated in Oregon with a major Earth Show established and curated by K.A. Colorado (Troutdale celebrates art and the arch, The Gresham Outlook, May 5, 2010).  The artist organized a city-wide exhibition and managed artists from the US, Canada, and the U.K., to present earth- and environment-themed art featuring sculptures, paintings, glass, printmaking, music, dance, and photography (Art show ushers in Centennial Arch, The Oregonian, May 8, 2010).  

K.A. Colorado completed a large-scale group of paintings in 2011 entitled A 60-Second Time-Lapse of the World depicting vanishing icebergs among warm skies in the Arctic. This series was part of his artwork portraying the warming Polar regions and melting icecaps.  The paintings were installed at the Portland International Airport (Oregon) in the main entrance, and were exhibited during 2011 and 2012.

The artist's work with ice and snow, and his portrayal of climate change – specifically as occurring at the North Pole and South Pole – led to exhibits in the Arctic and Antarctic regions.  K.A. Colorado brought Argentine artist Andrea Juan to Perm, Russia in 2011, where both artists exhibited their respective photographic works at the Exhibition Center Expo Perm.  Colorado's works exhibited included his Frost Byte Series portraying cold climate encountered by Polar explorers.

K.A. Colorado was invited by the Argentine Ministerio de Relaciones Exteriores y Culto and the Dirección Nacional del Antártico of Argentina to perform on-site art installations on the continent of Antarctica in early 2012.  The invitation was made in recognition of the artist's work with the Polar regions.  During his residency in Antarctica, and his on-site work on the Antarctic continent, K.A. Colorado completed a series of five Banquet in the Antarctic groups of works involving sculpture, photography, video, and performance-art installations.  The artist described the theme of the installations as a memorial to the animals of early Polar exploration and to the changing environment of the Antarctic.    

Colorado participated by invitation in "Antarctic Week", a conference presented by the government of Tierra del Fuego on issues related to the Antarctic and sub Antarctic.  Colorado's artwork and installations, Banquet in Antarctica, were featured at the Fuegian Museum of Art (Museo Fueguino de Arte) and the Museo Del Fin Del Mundo during the 10th Science and Technology Week and the Antarctic Week in Tierra del Fuego.  His work was also exhibited at the Rio Grande Museum, presented by the Secretaria de Cultura, the Jefatura de Gabinete, and CADIC-CONICET.

K.A. Colorado's work Banquet in Antarctica was also featured in the Sur Polar IV Exhibition of 2012 at the Tigre Museum in Buenos Aires (Museo de Arte Tigre).  

In 2013, the artist presented his Antarctic work at the Gallery of Contemporary Art of Xalapa – Mexico as part of South Polar Xalapa.

K.A. Colorado created a series of paintings in 2015 that, according to the Vancouver Sun, portray the majesty and fragility of icebergs facing global warming and climate change in the Arctic.  The large paintings group, entitled 60 Seconds in the Canadian Arctic, was exhibited at the Vancouver Maritime Museum in British Columbia, Canada, for three years, from 2015 to 2018.  

K.A. Colorado was commissioned by the Vancouver Maritime Museum (British Columbia, Canada) to create a sculpture for permanent installation in the museum in 2018.  For this commission, the artist created On Thin Ice, a monumental wall sculpture incorporating historical and archival referencing about the Arctic and the Northwest Passage.

Positions and Published Works

Artist-in-Residence, Lecturer, and Author

The National Oceanic and Atmospheric Administration (NOAA) tapped K.A. Colorado to become Artist-in-Residence for the National Marine Sanctuary System in 2015.  The selection of Colorado was made after viewing the artist's Ice Core Sculptures.  Colorado was chosen to portray the importance of marine sanctuaries and the fragility of these natural resources.  As Artist-in-Residence, Colorado completed a major sculptural series of Ice Core Sculptures for the National Marine Sanctuaries.  The sculptures depicted the significance of deep cold and ice to the health and viability of the oceans.

In October 2016, the artist presented at the University of Portland (Portland, Oregon) a lecture entitled The Moral Implications of Deep Cold and Polar Ice on the Climate Change Debate.

K.A. Colorado's environmental art installation at a retreating glacier in the Yukon was published in the June 2018 issue of the Journal of Maps in an article entitled “Boundary”: Mapping and Visualizing Climatically Changed Landscapes at Kaskawulsh Glacier and Kluane Lake, Yukon.  The installation artistically measured and referenced climate change effects on the melting glacier and landscape.  In completing this project, the artist worked in the field with scientists from Simon Fraser University, the University of Washington at Tacoma, and the University of Illinois at Chicago.  It was the culmination of several years’ work, wherein Colorado visually portrayed the climate changes occurring in real time in the Kluane National Park Reserve.  The fieldwork portion was in conjunction with the Arctic Institute of North America.  Colorado's images photographed of his installation on-site were featured in the article, which was also co-authored by Colorado. The Boundary project was completed in 2016 and published in 2018.

During 2018 and 2019, K.A. Colorado was Artist-in-Residence at the University of Northern British Columbia in Prince George, B.C., Canada, where he completed two additional major art pieces installed in the Hakai Cryosphere Node and in the university campus main hall.  

Colorado also lectured to classes and led environmental projects at King George Secondary School in Vancouver, B.C., Canada during 2018 and 2019, wherein he created an Ice Core Wall Sculpture entitled On Thin Ice for permanent exhibition at the school.  As part of the project, Colorado encouraged the school's Earth Club students to write poetry inspired by the artwork, which he then excerpted and imbedded into the sculpture.

The artist authored a paper entitled Aesthetic Considerations and Implications of Snow Mass and Texture Changes which was officially presented at the International Conference on Hydrometeorological Security in Moscow, Russia in 2006.

Awards and Talks

K.A. Colorado was selected Artist of the Year by LA Artcore Union Center in 2008.

The artist gave a TED talk at TEDx in Monterey in 2010.

Films

K.A. Colorado documented his time in Antarctica and the Arctic in his two films, "Melt"  and "Carbon" , which show the effects of the process of global warming and ocean acidification on the Polar ice caps and the wildlife residents of the Polar regions.

Climate Change Artwork

K.A. Colorado lives in Vancouver, British Columbia, and is a permanent resident of Canada.  He is married to the noted author & producer, Mary R. Tahan Mary R. Tahan - Writer & Producer of Books, Films, Photography, and Documentaries, whose recent works include Roald Amundsen’s Sled Dogs: The Sledge Dogs Who Helped Discover the South Pole Roald Amundsen’s Sled Dogs: The Sledge Dogs Who Helped Discover the South Pole and The Life of José María Sobral: Scientist, Diarist, and Pioneer in Antarctica The Life of José María Sobral : Scientist, Diarist, and Pioneer in Antarctica.  K.A. Colorado works internationally on art that depicts climate change and the environment.

References

Newspaper References

 The cow on the iceberg, North Shore Outlook, (North Vancouver, B.C.), April 22, 2010.
 Troutdale celebrates art and the arch, The Gresham Outlook, (Oregon), May 5, 2010, page 1B.
 Art show ushers in Centennial Arch, The Oregonian, May 8, 2010, page 1E.

External links
 K.A. Colorado's website K.A. COLORADO.

Canadian painters
Canadian sculptors
1946 births
Living people